Mark S. Meadows (born April 29, 1947) is an attorney and politician from East Lansing, Michigan. He sat on the East Lansing City Council from 1995 to 2006, and from 2015 until his resignation during a city council meeting on July 14, 2020.  While on city council, he served as East Lansing Mayor from 1997 to 2006 and again from 2015 to 2019,  He is a former member of the Michigan House of Representatives.

Career
Mark Meadows began his career as an Assistant Attorney General for the Michigan Department of Attorney General in 1975, after earning his Juris Doctor degree that year from the University of Detroit Mercy School of Law.  Some notable cases involved represented the Department of Social Services, Mental Health, Natural Resources, and State Police.  He also represented the Public Service Commission and was general counsel to the Commission on Law Enforcement Standards.  He retired from the Department of Attorney General in 2002 and joined the law firm of Willingham and Cote in East Lansing.

Meadows ran for East Lansing City Council in 1993 but was unsuccessful. In 1995 he ran again, winning the seat and later being appointed by the council to serve as Mayor from 1997 until stepping down in 2005.

He served the 69th District of the Michigan House of Representatives from 2007 through 2012.  In 2012 Meadows ran for judge of 54B District Court, losing to Andrea Larkin.

In 2015, he again was elected to the East Lansing City Council and appointed Mayor.  He stepped down as Mayor in 2017 but remained a councilperson until abruptly resigning in protest during a City Council Meeting on July 14, 2020 where council voted to terminate the City Attorney's contract.

Meadows has served on various committees and boards, including the East Lansing Commission on the Environment, The East Lansing Planning Commission, the Board of Directors for the Michigan Festival and National Folk Festival, and the Lansing/East Lansing Smartzome Local Development Finance Authority.

References

External links
 Mark Meadows's Voting Record

1947 births
Democratic Party members of the Michigan House of Representatives
Mayors of East Lansing, Michigan
Living people
21st-century American politicians